Events from the year 1839 in the United Kingdom.

Incumbents
 Monarch – Victoria
 Prime Minister – William Lamb, 2nd Viscount Melbourne (Whig)
 Foreign Secretary –  Henry John Temple, 3rd Viscount Palmerston
 Parliament – 13th

Events
 January – the first parallax measurement of the distance to Alpha Centauri is published by Thomas Henderson.
 19 January – British East India Company captures Aden.
 25 January – H. Fox Talbot shows his "photogenic drawings" at the Royal Institution in London. Sara Anne Bright is also producing such photographic reproductions this year.
 29 January – naturalist Charles Darwin marries his cousin Emma Wedgwood at Maer, Staffordshire.
 February – Report on the Affairs of British North America published.
 26 February – first nationally recognised Grand National run, at Aintree. It is won by Jem Mason riding Lottery.
 1 March – Sussex County Cricket Club, England's oldest county club, is formed.
 26 March – the first Henley Royal Regatta is held on the River Thames.
 9 April – the world's first commercial electric telegraph line comes into operation alongside the Great Western Railway line from London Paddington station to West Drayton.
 19 April – the Treaty of London establishes Belgium as a kingdom with its independence and neutrality guaranteed by Britain and the other great powers of Europe.
 May
 J. M. W. Turner completes his painting The Fighting Temeraire.
 Cambridge Camden Society established by John Mason Neale, Alexander Beresford Hope and Benjamin Webb to promote Gothic architecture.
 1 May – start of Eyre's expeditions to the interior of South Australia.
 7–11 May – Bedchamber Crisis: Robert Peel asks that Queen Victoria dismiss her Ladies of the Bedchamber as a condition for his forming a government. Victoria refuses to accept the condition, and Melbourne is persuaded to stay on as Prime Minister.
 13 May – first Rebecca Riots targeted against Welsh turnpikes, at Efailwen in Carmarthenshire.
 31 May – important British constitutional case of Stockdale v Hansard is launched when publisher John Joseph Stockdale sues for libel after John Roberton's pseudo-medical work On Diseases of the Generative System (1811) is declared in a parliamentary report to be indecent.
 3 June – destruction of opium at Humen begins, casus belli for Britain to open the 3-year First Opium War against Qing dynasty China.
 28 June – coal mine explosion at St Hilda pit, South Shields, kills 51.
 July – first Royal Show (agricultural show) held, in Oxford.
 4 July – Chartists riot in Birmingham.
 15 July – first clipper ship launched in Britain, the schooner Scottish Maid at Alexander Hall's yard in Aberdeen.
 23 July – British forces under Sir John Keane capture the fortress city of Ghazni, Afghanistan in the Battle of Ghazni during the First Anglo-Afghan War.
 17 August – Custody of Infants Act (based largely on campaigning by Caroline Norton) permits limited rights of custody of young children to divorced mothers.
 23 August – British forces seize Hong Kong as a base, as it prepares to wage the First Opium War.
 30 August – the Eglinton Tournament, a recreation of a medieval tourney, takes place at Eglinton Castle, North Ayrshire, Scotland.
 19 October – George Bradshaw publishes the first national railway timetable, Bradshaw's Railway Time Tables and Assistant to Railway Travelling, in Manchester.
 4 November – Newport Rising: between 5,000 and 10,000 Chartist sympathisers led by John Frost, many of them coal miners, march on Newport, Monmouthshire, to liberate Chartist prisoners; around 22 are killed when troops, directed by Thomas Phillips, the mayor, fire on the crowd. This is the last large-scale armed civil rebellion against authority in mainland Britain and sees the most deaths.
 November – launch of the first British ocean-going iron warship,  for the East India Company, by William Laird at Birkenhead.
 5 December – Uniform Fourpenny Post introduced, a major postal reform, whereby 4d is levied for pre-paid letters up to half an ounce in weight instead of postage being calculated by distance and number of sheets of paper.
 24 December – an enormous landslide occurs at Axmouth in Devon, creating the Axmouth to Lyme Regis Undercliff. A report by geologists William Daniel Conybeare and William Buckland is one of the earliest scientific descriptions of such an event.
 December – New Committee of Council on education sets up a national system of Inspectors of Schools for grant-aided establishments.

Undated
 County Police Act enables the appointment of police in rural areas and City of London Police Act confirms establishment of a force in the City.
 Sisters of Mercy establish the first native Roman Catholic convent in England since the Reformation, at Bermondsey in London.
 Michael Faraday publishes Experimental Researches in Electricity clarifying the true nature of electricity.
 Claimed invention of the rear-wheel driven bicycle by Kirkpatrick Macmillan in Scotland.
Summer – John Ruskin visits Cornwall, regretting that reading for his Oxford degree interferes with his study of basalt at St Michael's Mount.

Ongoing
 Smallpox epidemic of 1837–40.

Publications
 Philip James Bailey's (anonymous) poem Festus.
 Charles Darwin's Journal of Researches into the Geology and Natural History of the Various Countries Visited by H.M.S. Beagle under the Command of Captain FitzRoy, R.N., from 1832 to 1839.
 Mrs William Ellis's conduct book The Women of England: their social duties and domestic habits.

Births
 7 January – Ouida (Maria Louise Ramé), novelist (died 1908)
 16 March – John Butler Yeats, Irish painter (died 1922)
 17 June – Arthur Tooth, Anglican clergyman prosecuted for Ritualist practices in the 1870s (died 1931)
 18 July – James Surtees Phillpotts, educationalist (died 1930)
 4 August – Walter Pater, essayist and critic (died 1894)
 19 September – George Cadbury, businessman (died 1922)
 7 December – Redvers Buller, general, Victoria Cross recipient (died 1908)
 22 December – John Nevil Maskelyne, stage magician (died 1917)

Deaths
 16 January – Edmund Lodge, writer (born 1756)
 28 January – Sir William Beechey, portrait painter (born 1753)
 11 April – John Galt, novelist (born 1779)
 22 April – Thomas Haynes Bayly, poet (died 1839)
 17 May –  Archibald Alison, author (born 1757)
 15 July – Winthrop Mackworth Praed, politician and poet (born 1802)
 28 August – William Smith, geologist (born 1769)
 24 October – Sir William Charles Ellis, physician specialising in mental illness (born 1780)
 15 November – William Murdoch, inventor (born 1754)
 24 December – James Smith, author (born 1775)

See also
 1839 in Scotland

References

 
Years of the 19th century in the United Kingdom